is a former Japanese football player.

Playing career
Sugimoto was born in Tenri on June 17, 1981. After graduating from high school, he joined J1 League club Cerezo Osaka in 2000. He played several matches as forward and left midfielder from first season. However the club was relegated to J2 League from 2002 and he could hardly play in the match in 2002. Although the club returned to J1 in a year, he could not play at all in the match in 2003. In August 2003, he moved to J2 club Ventforet Kofu. However he could hardly play in the match. In 2004, he moved to J2 club Yokohama FC. He played many matches as left midfielder in 2004. However he could not play at all in the match in 2005 and retired end of 2005 season.

Club statistics

References

External links

1981 births
Living people
Association football people from Nara Prefecture
Japanese footballers
J1 League players
J2 League players
Cerezo Osaka players
Ventforet Kofu players
Yokohama FC players
Association football midfielders